Jorge Duílio Benítez Candia (born 23 April 1927) is a former Paraguayan football attacking midfielder.

Career
Benítez holds the all-time highest goalscorer record for Paraguay in a single match: Four goals against Bolivia in the 1949 South American Championship.

Benítez suffered from heart problems, thus when he signed with Argentine club Boca Juniors in 1949 a clause in his contract specified that he was the sole responsible for the risks of playing with such condition.

In the years 1956 e 1957, played for Náutico. Despite not having won any title in the lands of Pernambuco, stood out next to the attacker Ivson.

Honours

Club
Nacional
Primera División: 1946

Boca Juniors
Primera División: Runners-up 1950

Flamengo
Campeonato Carioca: 1953, 1954, 1955

International
South American Championship: Runners-up 1949

References

1927 births
Paraguayan footballers
Paraguayan expatriate footballers
Club Nacional footballers
Boca Juniors footballers
Expatriate footballers in Argentina
Expatriate footballers in Brazil
CR Flamengo footballers
Argentine Primera División players
Living people
Association football midfielders